Synapse Software Corporation (marketed as SynSoft in the UK) was an American video game development and publishing company founded in 1981 by Ihor Wolosenko and Ken Grant. It initially focused on the Atari 8-bit family, then later developed for the Commodore 64 and other systems. The company was purchased by Broderbund in late 1984, and the Synapse label retired in 1985.

After some initial releases directly based on existing games, such as clones of Sega's Head On and a variant of Atari Inc's Avalanche, 1982's Shamus established Synapse as a creator of high quality action games. It was followed by additional well-received games including Rainbow Walker, Blue Max, and The Pharaoh's Curse, and some others based on unusual concepts, like Necromancer and Alley Cat. First-person game Dimension X was promoted for its "altered perspective scrolling" technology, then released in a cut-down form over nine months later to disappointing reviews. The company also sold databases, a 6502 assembler, and a suite of biofeedback hardware and software. A series of productivity applications published in 1983, including a spreadsheet, led to financial difficulties and the company's downfall.

Action games
Synapse's first releases were for the Atari 8-bit computers, starting in 1981. Some of their early games were based on elements of contemporary arcade games. Protector (1981) uses elements of Defender, and Dodge Racer (1981) is a clone of Sega's Head On. Chicken (1982) has the same basic concept as Kaboom! for the Atari 2600, which itself is similar to the arcade game Avalanche.

Nautilus (1982) features a split-screen so two players can play at once. In one-player mode the user controls a submarine, the Nautilus, in the lower screen while the computer controls a destroyer, the Colossus, in the upper screen. Similar to Atari's Combat, in two-player mode another player takes control of the destroyer.  The same basic system was later re-used in other games, including Shadow World.

Survivor (1982) supports up to four simultaneous players, via the four joystick ports on the Atari 400 and Atari 800 computers. Each player commands a different part of a single spaceship. In single-player mode it operates like the ship in Asteroids, while in two player mode one drives and the other fires in any direction.

In an interview with Antic, Wolosenko agreed that 1982's Shamus was the beginning of Synapse's reputation for quality products. Other high quality, better advertised games followed in 1982-3. These include Necromancer, Rainbow Walker, Blue Max, Fort Apocalypse, Alley Cat, and The Pharaoh's Curse. It was during this period that the company branched out and started supporting other systems, especially the Commodore 64, which became a major platform. Many of Synapse's games made their way to the UK as part of the initial wave of U.S. Gold-distributed imports (under the "Synsoft" imprint). Some were also converted to run on the more popular UK home computers, such as the ZX Spectrum.

Synapse was an early developer for the unsuccessful graphics-accelerated Mindset computer project and created the first-person game Vyper (1984) for it.

Ports and re-releases
Synapse developed an official port of the arcade video game Zaxxon for the Commodore 64. The Atari port was from Datasoft. Synapse also published Encounter! in 1983, which was originally released in the UK by Novagen Software without the exclamation mark in the name. Salmon Run was published by the Atari Program Exchange in 1982; Synapse released a VIC-20 port under the "Showcase Software" label the following year.

Utilities and productivity software

Although it is for their success with arcade-style games that it is primarily remembered, Synapse started out selling database software for the Atari 8-bit computers. In 1982 Synapse released SynAssembler, a 6502 development system which was much faster than Atari's offerings at the time. SynAssembler is a port of the S-C Assembler II Version 4.0 from the Apple II. The port was done by Steve Hales, who also wrote a number of games for Synapse.

Synapse was developing a series of home productivity and financial applications: SynFile+ (written in Forth by Steve Ahlstrom and Dan Moore of The 4th Works), SynCalc, Synfilet, SynChron, SynComm, SynStock, and SynTrend.

Interactive fiction
Some time before their demise, Synapse had started work on interactive fiction games (or as they called them, "Electronic Novels"). The games were all based on a parser called "BTZ" (Better Than Zork), written by William Mataga and Steve Hales. Seven games were written using the system but only four released, the best-known being the critically acclaimed Mindwheel.

Downfall
By early 1984 Synapse was the largest third-party provider of Atari 8-bit software, but 65% of its sales came from the Commodore market. The company ran into financial difficulty. According to Steve Hales they had taken a calculated risk in developing the series of productivity applications and had entered into a collaboration with Atari, Inc. When Jack Tramiel purchased Atari's consumer division from Warner Communications, he refused to pay for the 40,000 units of software that had been shipped.

Thrown into a cash crisis, Synapse was purchased by Broderbund Software in late 1984. Although the intention had been to keep Synapse going, the market had changed, and they were unable to make money from the
electronic novels. Approximately one year after the takeover, Broderbund closed Synapse down.

Software published by Synapse
Games separated by a slash were sold together as "Double Plays," with one being a bonus game on the other side of the disk. Rainbow Walker was initially sold by itself, and the second game added later.

Showcase Software
At the 1983 Consumer Electronics Show, Synapse announced it would publish games for the VIC-20. These were a mix of original titles and ports and were sold under the name Showcase Software. Only some of the announced games were released.

 Astro Patrol
 Salmon Run - originally published in 1982 for the Atari 8-bit family through the Atari Program Exchange
 Squeeze

References

External links
 Scans and information on Synapse's Atari products

Atari 8-bit family
Defunct software companies of the United States
Defunct video game companies of the United States

1985 disestablishments in California
American companies disestablished in 1985